Zakaria Ben Mustapha (July 7, 1925 – June 4, 2019) was a Tunisian politician. He served as the 
Minister of Culture from 1987 to 1988 and the Mayor of Tunis from 1980 until 1986.

Mustapha died on June 4, 2019, at the age of 94.

References

1925 births
2019 deaths
Government ministers of Tunisia
Mayors of Tunis
Governors of Sfax Governorate
Governors of Gabès Governorate
Democratic Constitutional Rally politicians
Socialist Destourian Party politicians